Maze game is a video game genre description first used by journalists during the 1980s to describe any game in which the entire playing field is a maze. Quick player action is required to escape monsters, outrace an opponent, or navigate the maze within a time limit. After the release of Namco's Pac-Man in 1980, many maze games followed its conventions of completing a level by traversing all paths and a way of temporarily turning the tables on pursuers.

Overhead-view maze games
While the character in a maze would have a limited view, the player is able to see much or all of the maze. Maze chase games are a specific subset of the overheard perspective. They’re listed in a separate section.

First-person maze games

Maze chase games

This subgenre is exemplified by Namco's Pac-Man (1980), where the goal is to clear a maze of dots while being pursued. Pac-Man spawned many sequels and clones which, in Japan, are often called "dot eat games". Other maze chases don't have dots, and the goal is clear the maze of the pursuers themselves (e.g., Pengo, Guzzler, Jungler).

Grid capture games
In grid capture games, also called line coloring games, the maze consists of lines, and the goal is to capture rectangular areas by traversing their perimeters. The gameplay is not fundamentally different from Pac-Man (players still have to navigate the entire maze to complete a level) but enough games have used the grid motif that it is a distinct style. One unique element is that it is possible to capture multiple rectangles simultaneously, usually for extra points. Amidar established the model for this subgenre.

References

 
Maze games